It's the Great Pumpkin may refer to:

 It's the Great Pumpkin, Charlie Brown (1966 telefilm), a 1966 animated television special
 It's the Grand Pumpkin, Milhouse (2008 TV sketch), an animated segment in the 2008 Halloween episode "Treehouse of Horror XIX" of The Simpsons
 It's the Great Pumpkin, Sam Winchester (2008 TV episode), 2008 Halloween episode from season 4 of Supernatural